John Day, John Daye or Jon Day may refer to:

People

Politicians
John Day (Nova Scotia legislator) (died 1775), merchant and politician in Nova Scotia
John Day Jr. (died 1792), soldier and political figure in Nova Scotia
John Day (judge) (1797–1859), Liberian politician and judge
John Charles Day (1826–1908), English judge
John Adam Day (1901–1966), politician in Devon, England
John Day (Indiana politician) (born 1937), Democratic member of the Indiana House of Representatives
John Day (Australian politician) (born 1955), Western Australian politician
 John Day, Transport Workers Union of America Local 100 Vice President

Sportspeople
John Barham Day (1793–1860), English jockey and trainer
John Day (cricketer, born 1812), English cricketer
John Day (horseman) (1819–1883), English jockey and trainer
John B. Day (1847–1925), manager of the New York Giants in 1899
John Day (jockey) (1856–1885) Australian champion pedestrian and 1870 Melbourne Cup winner
John Day (cricketer, born 1881) (1881–1949), English cricketer

Other people
John Day (merchant) (fl. 1497–98), English merchant, author of a letter referring to existence of lost book Inventio Fortunata
John Day (printer) (c. 1522–1584), English Protestant printer, also known as John Daye
John Day (dramatist) (1574–c. 1638), English dramatist
John Day (carpenter) (died 1774), first recorded death in a submarine
John Day (trapper) (c. 1770–1820), American hunter and trapper
John Day (architect) (fl. 1798–1802), Irish architect from County Wexford
John Day (priest) (1802–1879), clergyman in the Church of Ireland
John Day (botanist) (1824–1888), Victorian orchid collector and illustrator
John Medway Day (1838–1905), Australian journalist and activist
John Other Day (fl. 1862–1912), Native American who sought peace between Indian tribes and white settlers
John H. Day (1909–1989), South African marine biologist and invertebrate zoologist
John A. Day (1913–2008), American meteorologist, educator and sky-watching evangelist
John Day (historian) (1924–2003), American historian
John Day (computer scientist) (born 1947), ARPANET pioneer and early RFC contributor
John Day (RAF officer) (born 1947), British air marshal
Johnny Daye (1948–2017), American soul music singer
John Day (biblical scholar) (born 1948), professor of Old Testament Studies
Jon Day (born 1954), British civil servant
Jon Day (born 1962), member of The Charlatans
Jon Day (writer) (fl. 2010s), British writer, critic and academic

Places
John Day, Oregon, a city 
John Day River, a tributary of the Columbia River in northeastern Oregon
John Day River (northwestern Oregon), a different tributary of the Columbia River

Other uses
John Day (film), a 2013 Indian film
John Day Company, a New York publisher founded in 1926

See also
John Day Dam, a dam on the Columbia River
John Day Fossil Beds National Monument